Spread may refer to:

Places
 Spread, West Virginia

Arts, entertainment, and media
 Spread (film), a 2009 film. 
 $pread, a quarterly magazine by and for sex workers
 "Spread", a song by OutKast from their 2003 album Speakerboxxx/The Love Below
 Spreadability, a concept in media studies
 Page spread, an aspect of book design

Finance
 Spread, the difference in price between related securities, as in:
 Bid–offer spread, between the buying and selling price of a commodity and/or security
 Credit spread (bond), on bonds
 Option-adjusted spread, on mortgage backed securities where the borrower has the right to repay in full
 Options spread, building blocks of option trading strategies.
 Spread trade, between two related securities or commodities
  Spread option, payoff is based on the difference in price between two underlying assets
 Yield spread, difference in percentage rate of return of two instruments
 Z-spread, on mortgage backed securities

Gambling and sports
 Spread limit, a limit on a raise in poker
 The score difference being wagered on in spread betting
 Spread offense, an offensive scheme in American football designed to stretch the field horizontally

Mathematics
 Spread (intuitionism), a concept in intuitionistic mathematics
 Spread (rational trigonometry), the measure of line inclination in rational trigonometry
 Spread polynomials, a polynomial sequence arising in rational trigonometry
 Statistical dispersion

Science and technology
 Seafloor spreading, the process leading to continental drift
 Spread spectrum, communications signals over a range of frequencies
 Spread Toolkit - an open source toolkit that provides a high performance messaging service
 Spreading dynamics, the wetting of a surface, see Wetting#Spreading dynamics
 Spreadsheet, computer application software 
 Temperature-Dewpoint spread, dew point depression

Other uses
 Spread (food), an edible paste put on other foods.
 Spread or bedspread, a bed covering for protective or decorative use 
 Spread, the laying of Tarot cards for divinatory uses
 Spread, a term used for speed reading in policy debate
 Spread, real estate property or land
Spread (prison food), term for a prison meal made by inmates

See also